The Dundalk Democrat is a regional newspaper printed in Dundalk, Ireland. Established in 1849, it primarily serves County Louth as well as County Monaghan and parts of County Armagh, County Down, County Cavan and County Meath. It comes out every Tuesday with three editions: The Town Edition, The County Edition and The Monaghan Democrat. The paper is owned by Iconic Newspapers, which acquired Johnston Press's titles in the Republic of Ireland in 2014. The Dundalk Democrat is one of two non-free newspapers in Dundalk, the other being The Argus.

The original offices of the Dundalk Democrat still stand at No. 3 Earl Street in the centre of Dundalk. It now operates from 16b Williamsons Mall, a short distance from its original location.

References

External links

1849 establishments in Ireland
Democrat
Mass media in County Louth
Newspapers published in the Republic of Ireland
Publications established in 1849
Weekly newspapers published in Ireland